Unplugged is a live album and DVD by the American rock band Alice in Chains, released on July 30, 1996, by Columbia Records. It was recorded on April 10, 1996, at the Brooklyn Academy of Music's Majestic Theatre for the television series MTV Unplugged. The show was directed by Joe Perota and first aired on MTV on May 28, 1996. The MTV Unplugged was Alice in Chains' first concert in two and a half years, and contains live, acoustic versions of the band's biggest hits and lesser-known songs. A new song, "The Killer Is Me", was performed for the first time during the concert. The acoustic version of "Over Now" (originally released on Alice in Chains' 1995 self-titled album) was released as a single. The album debuted at No. 3 on the Billboard 200 chart, and has been certified platinum by the RIAA. The performance was released on DVD on October 26, 1999, and re-released as a CD/DVD package featuring unaired footage on September 18, 2007. The home video release has received gold certification by RIAA.

Background and recording
On April 10, 1996, Alice in Chains resurfaced to perform their first concert in two and a half years for MTV Unplugged, a program featuring all-acoustic set lists. The band was offered to do the segment numerous times prior to the actual taping before finally accepting. The show was recorded at the Brooklyn Academy of Music's Majestic Theatre and first aired on MTV on May 28, 1996. It was Layne Staley's idea to have big candles decorating the stage to keep it dark and moody, as the band never liked bright lights on stage, so Staley himself bought the candles at Seattle's Pike Place Market.

The performance was one of Alice in Chains' final appearances with vocalist Layne Staley and featured some of the band's highest charting singles, including "Rooster", "Down in a Hole", "Heaven Beside You", and "Would?", and introduced a new song, "The Killer Is Me". The show marked Alice in Chains' first appearance as a five-piece band, adding second guitarist Scott Olson.

Jerry Cantrell has attested to being fairly ill during the performance as a result of food poisoning from a hot dog consumed before the gig. Mike Inez's bass had the phrase "Friends Don't Let Friends Get Friends Haircuts..." written on it, directed at the members of Metallica who were in the audience and had recently cut their hair short. Inez and drummer Sean Kinney did pay tribute to Metallica, however, playing the intro to their hit song "Enter Sandman" just before "Sludge Factory". Before "Angry Chair," Jerry Cantrell paid further tribute by playing the intro to "Battery" going into the Hee Haw song, "Gloom, Despair, and Agony on Me". This was omitted from the CD but can be found on the VHS and DVD. On the CD version of the MTV Unplugged concert, as Staley says "Okay, that's it," at the end of the song, booing can be heard (presumably due to the performance concluding). Staley responded to the heckler by shouting, "Hey, fuck you, man!" which was greeted by laughter from the audience.

Cantrell has stated that the band was considering playing the songs "Love, Hate, Love" and "We Die Young" for the set, but ultimately chose not to, chiefly as a result of limited time. Moreover, a few songs such as "Got Me Wrong" and "Sludge Factory" had to be replayed numerous times due to error. Accordingly, the taping took approximately three hours to finish.

Cantrell said that one of his favorite things from the concert was when Staley said at the end of the show, "I wish I could hug you all, but I'm not gonna".

Release and reception

A live album of the performance was released in July 1996, which debuted at number three on the Billboard 200, and was accompanied by a home video release. The album has received platinum certification by the RIAA and the home video release has received gold certification by the RIAA. A full length DVD of the concert was also later released on October 26, 1999. The songs "Angry Chair", "Frogs", and "The Killer Is Me" were cut from the original MTV broadcast but are included on both the CD and home video releases. The album was re-released as a CD/DVD package on September 18, 2007.

The album initially received mixed reviews from critics. AllMusic's Stephen Thomas Erlewine wrote in his review of the album: "It doesn't offer anything that the albums don't already. The acoustic arrangements of the harder songs sound like novelties, and the rest sound like rehashes of their previous work, only without much energy." Sandy Masuo of Rolling Stone wrote in her review "Unplugged certainly reaffirms the emotional range and technical prowess of Alice in Chains. But it lacks electricity in more ways than one. The concentrated catharsis in Alice in Chains' music is still best heard with the amps cranked up to 11." Despite this, the album eventually gained more recognition and praise after the death of vocalist Layne Staley, mainly due to his powerful performance despite his condition, and is now considered an iconic live album. Alice Pattillo of Metal Hammer considers Alice in Chains' MTV Unplugged as the best live album ever made.

Track listing

DVD track listing

The DVD release shows another take of "Sludge Factory," in which Layne Staley mixes up the lyrics at the beginning of the song which is ended shortly after.  They then go into the "formal" take which was used on the CD.  The DVD's introduction to "Sludge Factory" also contains portions of "Enter Sandman", written by James Hetfield, Lars Ulrich, and Kirk Hammett.
On the DVD, the final song's title is listed onscreen as "Killer Is Me."  Note that while the CD also lists the final song as "Killer Is Me," the DVD's track list lists the song as "The Killer Is Me."  The song was also released in the Music Bank box set, where the title is again listed as "The Killer Is Me."

Personnel
Alice in Chains
Layne Staley – vocals; acoustic rhythm guitar on "Angry Chair"
Jerry Cantrell – acoustic lead guitar, vocals
Mike Inez – acoustic bass; acoustic rhythm guitar on "Killer Is Me"
Sean Kinney – drums, percussion
Additional performer
Scott Olson – acoustic rhythm and solo guitar; acoustic bass on "Killer Is Me"
Production
Produced by Toby Wright and Alice in Chains
Produced for MTV by Alex Coletti
Recorded by Toby Wright and John Harris, assisted by Brian Kingman, John Bates, and Rich Lamb
Mixed by Toby Wright, assisted by John Bleich and John Seymour
Digitally edited by Don C. Tyler
Mastered by Stephen Marcussen
DVD audio by John Alberts, Toby Wright, and Mike Fisher
Directed by Joe Perota
Line producer – Audrey Morrissey
Art direction – Mary Maurer
Design – Doug Erb
Photography – Danny Clinch
Management – Susan Silver

Charts

Weekly charts

Year-end charts

Singles

Video

Certifications

Album

Video

References

External links

Alice in Chains albums
Alice in Chains video albums
MTV Unplugged albums
1996 video albums
Live video albums
1996 live albums
Live grunge albums
Columbia Records live albums
Columbia Records video albums